Polly James (born 8 July 1941) is an English actress with a career in theatre, film, television and radio.

Career
Pauline James was born in Blackburn, Lancashire, under the name Pauline Devaney. After graduating from RADA, her TV career began in BBC2's Thirty-Minute Theatre, followed by the role of a drug addict in Z-Cars in 1967. She played Audrey Hargreaves in Coronation Street in 1967.

She is best known for her role as Beryl Hennessey in the first four series of the British sitcom The Liver Birds (1969–74), mostly alongside Nerys Hughes. She played Cicely Courtneidge in the biographical musical of the actress Once More with Music in 1976, and appeared as a soubrette in Alan Clarke's 1982 production of Baal. She played the role of Jane Hampden on "The Awakening" episode of Doctor Who in 1984. She appeared in the West End musicals I and Albert and Anne of Green Gables.  In 1971, James appeared with the Royal Shakespeare Company in The Merchant of Venice with Judi Dench.

James appeared as Jenny Wren in the 1976 BBC adaptation of Dickens's Our Mutual Friend.

Personal life
She is divorced and has one child by actor Clive Francis.

Television roles

Comedy

Children's

References

External links 
 

1941 births
Alumni of RADA
British actresses
Living people
People from Blackburn